Jinjiang is a county-level city of Quanzhou City, Fujian Province, China. It is located in the southeastern part of the province, on the right or south bank of the Jin River, across from Quanzhou's urban district of Fengze. Jinjiang also borders the Taiwan Strait of the East China Sea to the south, and Quanzhou's other county-cities of Shishi and Nan'an to the east and west, respectively.

Administrative divisions 

Jinjiang has six subdistricts and 13 towns:

Subdistricts
Lingyuan

Meiling
Qingyang
Xintang
Xiyuan

Towns
Anhai
Chendai
Chidian
Cizao
Dongshi
Jinjing
Longhu
Neikeng
Shenhu
Xibin
Yinglin
Yonghe
Zimao

Demographics
Jinjiang is known for the large number of factories which operate there, especially in the clothing and name-brand footwear industry. Many migrant laborers come from elsewhere in Fujian and even from outside the province to commit themselves to year-long contracts.

Jinjiang is famous as home to many Chinese in diaspora, especially in Taiwan, Philippines, Malaysia, Singapore, Myanmar, Australia, etc. Once poor and overpopulated in late 19th century, many locals moved to Southeast Asia for better lives in what they called "". Many of them have been successfully integrated into local societies and achieved great success. For example, according to Forbes, 6 out of 10 richest business tycoons in Philippines can trace their ancestry back to Jinjiang. Therefore, from 80s to 90s, Jinjiang received much donation and investment from overseas Chinese communities.

Culture

Language
Jinjiang people speak the Jinjiang dialect, a variant of the Quanzhou dialect of Hokkien, which is largely intelligible to speakers of other Quanzhou, Xiamen, Zhangzhou and Taiwanese dialects, and also to speakers of other Hokkien dialects in many Chinese communities overseas, especially in places in southeast Asia such as Philippines, Singapore, Southern Peninsular Malaysian/Riau, Penang, Medan, etc. As in many parts of China, most Jinjiang people can use Putonghua (Mandarin) to communicate with non-local people in commercial and other daily interactions.

Transportation

Jinjiang hosts the Quanzhou Jinjiang International Airport, IATA code JJN. The facility is of international 4D standard, which is capable of handling mid-size jets, such as Boeing 737 series and Airbus 320 series. Most flights from JJN are domestic flights, with some international/regional flights to/from Hong Kong, Macao, Taipei, Manila, Bangkok, Singapore, etc. Another way to get into the city is flying into Xiamen Gaoqi International Airport in the nearby city Xiamen, which has more international routes, including intercontinental flights to/from Amsterdam, Sydney and Vancouver. From there, passengers can catch limousine buses to downtown Jinjiang in 1.5 hours.

Passengers are able to travel to bullet train hubs like Shanghai or Shenzhen in 2 to 3 hours, and further transfer to other destinations national wide. The Jinjiang Railway Station is served by local buses and taxi.

Economy
Thriving with economics in private sectors, Jinjiang has been ranked as No.1 county with the highest GDP in Fujian for over 15 consecutive years. Also, it's been ranked as top 10 richest county-level city in the whole country, as published by the National Bureau of Census. There are many sportswear and other garment and shoe manufacturers in Jinjiang. In 2013, the mayor of Jinjiang called for more focus on innovative design by shoe manufacturers plagued by surplus inventory.

Manufacturers were encouraged by local official to engage in IPOs and seek listings on stock exchanges such as the Frankfurt Stock Exchange to raise global capital for expansion. Raising capital in this way bypasses the difficulty medium-sized firms have with obtaining loans from Chinese banks. About 30 firms have achieved listing on global stock exchanges but many also have listings on stock exchanges in Shanghai or Hong Kong. As of 2012, many additional local firms include IPOs in their business planning.

In some instances over-capacity and declining profit margins have resulted from suboptimal investment of capital. Due to the prevalence of copying in the industry investing capital in research and development seems futile. Another problem is that many of the firms are in fact family-owned business which have taken on corporate form but not best corporate management practices. In an effort to achieve listings on exchanges with strict requirements there is a temptation to engage in creative accounting.

Climate

Notable people 
 Zhang Gaoli, a former Vice Premier of the People's Republic of China
 Gong Beibi, internationally awarded actress
 Yao Chen, actress and celebrity 
 Henry Sy, Chinese Filipino businessman, former richest man in the Philippines
 Shi Lang (1621–1696), admiral who served under the Ming and Qing dynasties
 Lai Changxing, smuggler
 Dee C. Chuan, Chinese Filipino businessman and philanthropist
 Eugene Chan, linguist
 Cai Chongda, Chinese writer and journalist

See also
 Chinese diaspora

References

External links

Arroyo lays wreath at Rizal Shrine in Jinjiang

 
Cities in Fujian
County-level divisions of Fujian
.